Advanced Gravis Computer Technology, Ltd. was a manufacturer of computer peripherals and hardware. The company was founded in 1982 in British Columbia, Canada.

Their most famous products were the Gravis PC GamePad, at one time one of the most popular gaming controllers for the PC, the once-ubiquitous Gravis Joystick (black with red buttons), and the Gravis Ultrasound add-on card, competitor to the Sound Blaster. At its peak, the company had almost 300 employees with a European office in The Netherlands, and was at the time the world's largest manufacturer of computer joysticks and gamepads.

The company was acquired by Kensington Computer Products Group towards the end of 1997 and has essentially disappeared.

References

External links

ftp.gravis.com drivers
 Herní ovladače počátku 90. let photos of disassembled Gravis PC GamePad

Computer peripheral companies
Computer companies established in 1982
Companies based in British Columbia
1982 establishments in British Columbia